Steven Ernest Sailer (born December 20, 1958) is an American paleoconservative journalist, movie critic, blogger, and columnist. He is a former correspondent for UPI and a columnist for Taki's Magazine and VDARE, a website associated with white supremacy, white nationalism, and the alt-right. He has a history of making racist statements, and writes about race relations, gender issues, politics, immigration, IQ, genetics, movies, and sports. As of 2014, Sailer ceased publishing his personal blog on his own website and shifted it to the Unz Review, an online publication founded by former businessman Ron Unz that promotes antisemitism, Holocaust denial, conspiracy theories, and white supremacist material.

Sailer has been credited with coining the pseudoscientific race theory known as "human biodiversity" in the 1990s, with the term later being used among the alt-right as a euphemism for scientific racism. In his writing for VDARE, Sailer has described black people as tending "to possess poorer native judgment than members of better educated groups".

Personal life 
Sailer was an adopted child; he grew up in Studio City, Los Angeles. He majored in economics, history, and management at Rice University (BA, 1980). He earned an MBA from UCLA in 1982 with two concentrations: finance and marketing. In 1982 he moved from Los Angeles to Chicago, and from then until 1985 he managed BehaviorScan test markets for Information Resources, Inc. In 1996, he was diagnosed with non-Hodgkin lymphoma, and in February 1997, he was treated with Rituxan. He has been in remission since those treatments. He became a full-time journalist in 2000 and left Chicago for California.

Writing career 
From 1994 to 1998, Sailer worked as a columnist for the conservative magazine National Review, in which he has since been sporadically published.

In August 1999, he debated Steve Levitt at the Slate website, calling into question Levitt's hypothesis, which would appear in the 2005 book Freakonomics, that legalized abortion in America reduced crime.

Sailer, along with Charles Murray and John McGinnis, was described as an "evolutionary conservative" in a 1999 National Review cover story by John O'Sullivan. Sailer's work frequently appears at Taki's Magazine and VDARE, while Sailer's analyses have been cited by newspapers such as The Washington Times, The New York Times, the San Francisco Chronicle and The Times of London. He has been featured as a guest on The Political Cesspool, a far-right radio program which has been widely criticized for promoting antisemitism and white supremacy. From 2000 to 2002, Sailer was a national correspondent for United Press International, reporting on sports, law, and politics, among other topics.

Sailer's January 2003 article "Cousin Marriage Conundrum", published in The American Conservative, argued that nation building in Iraq would likely fail because of the high degree of consanguinity among Iraqis due to the common practice of cousin marriage. This article was republished in The Best American Science and Nature Writing 2004.

In 2008, Sailer published his only book, America's Half-Blood Prince, an analysis of Barack Obama based on his memoir Dreams from My Father.

Sailer was the founder of an online electronic mailing list called Human Biodiversity Discussion Group.

Influence 
Sailer's writing has been described as a precursor to Trumpism, seeming "to exercise a kind of subliminal influence across much of the right in [the 2000s]. One could detect his influence even in the places where his controversial writing on race was decidedly unwelcome." Tyler Cowen has described Sailer as the "most significant neo-reaction thinker today." After the 2016 election, Michael Barone credited Sailer with having charted in 2001 the electoral path that Donald Trump had successfully followed.

Views and criticism 

Sailer has often written on issues of race and intelligence, arguing that some races are born with inherent advantages over others, but that conservative socio-economic policies can improve things for all.

Sailer has been described as a white supremacist by the Southern Poverty Law Center and the Columbia Journalism Review.

Sailer cites studies that say, on average, blacks and Mexicans in America have lower IQs than whites, and that Ashkenazi Jews and East Asians have higher IQs than non-Jewish whites. He also considers that "for at least some purposes—race actually is a highly useful and reasonable classification", such as for "finessing" Affirmative Action when that's "economically convenient", and for political gerrymandering.

Rodolfo Acuña, a Chicano studies professor, regards Sailer's statements on this subject as providing "a pretext and a negative justification for discriminating against US Latinos in the context of US history". Acuña claimed that listing Latinos as non-white gives Sailer and others "the opportunity to divide Latinos into races, thus weakening the group by setting up a scenario where lighter-skinned Mexicans are accepted as Latinos or Hispanics and darker-skinned Latinos are relegated to an underclass".

In an article on Hurricane Katrina, Sailer said in reference to the New Orleans slogan "let the good times roll" that it "is an especially risky message for African-Americans." He claimed that African-Americans tend to possess poorer native judgment than members of better-educated groups, and thus need stricter moral guidance from society. The article on Hurricane Katrina was criticized for being racist by Media Matters for America and the Southern Poverty Law Center, as well as some conservative commentators. Neoconservative columnist John Podhoretz wrote in the National Review Online blog that Sailer's statement was "shockingly racist and paternalistic" as well as "disgusting".

The "Sailer Strategy" 
The term "Sailer Strategy" has been used for Sailer's proposal that Republican candidates can gain political support in American elections by appealing to working-class white workers with heterodox right-wing nationalist and economic populist positions. In order to do this, Sailer suggested that Republicans support economic protectionism, identity politics, and express opposition to immigration, among other issues. The goal of this is to increase Republicans' share of the white electorate, and decrease its minority share of the electorate, in the belief that minority votes could not be won in significant numbers.

The strategy was similar to that used by Donald Trump in the 2016 presidential election, and has been claimed as one of the reasons Trump was able to win support from rural white voters.

References

External links 

1958 births
American white nationalists
Alt-right writers
Living people
Anti-immigration activists
American columnists
Journalists from California
National Review people
Paleoconservatism
Politics and race in the United States
Proponents of scientific racism
Race and intelligence controversy
Rice University alumni
UCLA Anderson School of Management alumni